Manuel Luna García (born January 11, 1984, in Mexico City) is a Mexican professional soccer player.

Club career
Luna has played in the Mexican second division as well as in El Salvador for UES.

References

1984 births
Living people
Footballers from Mexico City
Association football forwards
Mexican footballers
C.D. Chalatenango footballers
Mexican expatriate footballers
Expatriate footballers in El Salvador
Mexican expatriate sportspeople in El Salvador